The Making of the Mob is an American television docu-series detailing the emergence of organized crime in 20th-century America. The series premiered on June 15, 2015, on AMC, and is narrated by actor Ray Liotta. The series also features intercuts within each episode of archival footage and interviews with historians, authors, actors, law enforcement personnel, and family members. On July 31, 2015, AMC renewed the series for a second season of eight episodes, which premiered on July 11, 2016.

Overview

Season 1 (2015)

The first season, subtitled New York, highlighted Lucky Luciano, his rise in the New York City Mafia, and the creation of the Five Families.

Season 2 (2016)

The second season, subtitled Chicago, focuses on the origin of Al Capone, his Chicago Outfit, and their expansion into the Midwestern U.S.

Production
On January 10, 2015, AMC ordered the series as a "special event" miniseries to air in mid-2015. On July 31, 2015, two weeks after the series premiere, AMC renewed it for a second season to air in mid-2016.

Reception
The first season received mixed responses from television critics and a Metacritic score of 59 out of 100, based on six reviews, indicating "mixed or average reviews". The review aggregator website Rotten Tomatoes reported a 40% "rotten" critics rating based on five reviews.

References

External links

2015 American television series debuts
2016 American television series endings
AMC (TV channel) original programming
2010s American crime drama television series
2010s American documentary television series
Cultural depictions of American men
Cultural depictions of gangsters
English-language television shows
Historical television series
Period television series
Television series about organized crime
Works about the American Mafia